Vall Creek is a stream in the U.S. state of West Virginia.

Vall Creek most likely was named after the local Vall (or Vaal) family.

See also
List of rivers of West Virginia

References

Rivers of McDowell County, West Virginia
Rivers of West Virginia